Psamtik III (Ancient Egyptian: , pronounced ), known by the Graeco-Romans as Psammetichus or Psammeticus, or Psammenitus, was the last Pharaoh of the Twenty-sixth Dynasty of Egypt from 526 BC to 525 BC. Most of what is known about his reign and life was documented by the Greek historian Herodotus in the 5th century BC. Herodotus states that Psamtik had ruled Egypt for only six months before he was confronted by a Persian invasion of his country led by King Cambyses II of Persia. Psamtik was subsequently defeated at the Battle of Pelusium, and fled to Memphis where he was captured. The deposed pharaoh was carried off to Susa in chains, and later committed suicide.

Family

Psamtik III was the son of the pharaoh Amasis II and one of his wives, Queen Tentkheta. He succeeded his father as pharaoh in 526 BC, when Amasis died after a long and prosperous reign of some 44 years. According to Herodotus, he had a son named Amasis and a wife and daughter, both unnamed in historical documents.

Defeat and imprisonment

Psamtik ruled Egypt for no more than six months. A few days after his coronation, rain fell at Thebes, which was a rare event that frightened some Egyptians, who interpreted this as a bad omen. The young and inexperienced pharaoh was no match for the invading Persians. After the Persians under Cambyses had crossed the Sinai desert with the aid of the Arabians, a bitter battle was fought near Pelusium, a city on Egypt's eastern frontier, in the spring of 525 BC. The Egyptians were defeated at Pelusium and Psamtik was betrayed by one of his allies, Phanes of Halicarnassus. Consequently, Psamtik and his army were compelled to withdraw to Memphis. The Persians captured the city after a long siege, and captured Psamtik after its fall. Shortly thereafter, Cambyses ordered the public execution of two thousand of the principal citizens, including (it is said) a son of the fallen king.

Captivity and suicide

Psamtik's captivity and subsequent execution are described in The Histories by Herodotus, Book III, sections 14 and 15. Psamtik's daughter and the daughters of all the Egyptian noblemen were enslaved. Psamtik's son and two thousand other sons of noblemen were sentenced to death, in retaliation for the murder of the Persian ambassador and the two hundred crew of his boat. An "old man who had once been the king's friend" was reduced to beggary. All these people were brought before Psamtik to test his reaction, and he only became upset after seeing the state of the beggar.

Psamtik's compassion for the beggar caused him to be spared, but his son had already been executed. The deposed pharaoh was then raised up to live in the entourage of the Persian King. After a while, however, Psamtik attempted to raise a rebellion among the Egyptians. When Cambyses learned of this, Psamtik is reported by Herodotus to have drunk bull's blood and immediately died.

References

External links
Cartouche of Psammetichus
Herodotus histories

6th-century BC Pharaohs
Pharaohs of the Twenty-sixth Dynasty of Egypt
Year of birth unknown
525 BC deaths
6th-century BC executions

Dethroned monarchs